Mikhail Mamkin (born August 7, 1990) is a Russian professional ice hockey defenceman. He is currently playing with Salavat Yulaev Ufa of the Kontinental Hockey League (|KHL).

Mamkin made his Kontinental Hockey League (KHL) debut playing with Spartak Moscow during the 2011–12 KHL season.

References

External links

1990 births
Living people
Avtomobilist Yekaterinburg players
Russian ice hockey defencemen
Ice hockey people from Moscow
HC Spartak Moscow players
HC Sochi players
Toros Neftekamsk players
HC Yugra players